Bedford is a town in Hillsborough County, New Hampshire, United States. At the 2020 census, the population was 23,322, reflecting a growth of 10% from 2010. Bedford is a suburb of Manchester, New Hampshire's largest city.

History
In 1733, the Province of Massachusetts Bay established Bedford as "Narragansett, No. 5" for the benefit of soldiers who fought against the Narragansett people in Rhode Island. The area was also known as "Souhegan East". The settlement was incorporated as "Bedford" in 1750, and was named for John Russell, 4th Duke of Bedford. Lord Russell, a close friend of Governor Benning Wentworth, was the Secretary of State for the Southern Department from 1748 to 1751, and his first wife, Diana Spencer, was cousin to the influential Duke of Marlborough.

The first English settlers in Bedford were Robert and James Walker III. A monument dated 1737 stands on what is now known as Station Road (adjacent to Hawthorne Drive), marking the first settlement. Bedford's first moderator was Mayor John Goffe, son of the Colonel John Goffe after whom Goffstown was named.

In 1874, Bedford was served by the Concord Railroad, and service by the Manchester and Ashburnham Railroad was being planned.

Like much of southeastern New Hampshire, Bedford grew rapidly in the second half of the 20th century. The 2000 population of 18,274 was over eight times the population in 1950 of 2,176. Every decade in that period had a substantial rate of growth, ranging from 33 percent between 1980 and 1990 to a 67 percent increase between 1950 and 1960. As of the 2020 census, Bedford was the 11th largest municipality in the state, with a population of 23,322.

Geography
The largest body of water other than the Merrimack River is Sebbins Pond, which is connected to smaller, neighboring bodies of water by Sebbins Brook.

A rock formation called Pulpit Rock (originally the Devil's Pulpit) is located in the northwest part of the town on New Boston Road and is the feature of the town-owned Pulpit Rock Conservation Area. Bedford lies fully within the Merrimack River watershed.

Adjacent municipalities 
 Goffstown, New Hampshire (north)
 Manchester, New Hampshire (east)
 Merrimack, New Hampshire (south)
 Amherst, New Hampshire (southwest)
 New Boston, New Hampshire (west)

Transportation
Two major highways run through Bedford. The Everett Turnpike runs north-south, and Route 101 runs east-west. The segment of the Everett Turnpike north of NH 101 and the segment of NH 101 east of the Everett Turnpike are designated Interstate 293; I-293 turns at this interchange.

The portion of Route 101 in eastern Bedford is a freeway, while the majority of the route through Bedford and to the west is a surface road. US 3 and Route 114 also run through Bedford.

Manchester–Boston Regional Airport is one town away, in Manchester.

A proposed extension of the MBTA Commuter Rail's Lowell Line would see trains being extended to the neighboring city of Manchester, making stops at Nashua and Bedford along the way. The proposed Bedford/MHT station stop would be located in Bedford underneath the Raymond Wieczorek Drive Bridge, and is intended to serve both the town of Bedford and Manchester-Boston Regional Airport.

Government and politics 
Bedford is part of New Hampshire's 1st congressional district, currently represented by Democrat Chris Pappas. Bedford is part of the Executive Council of New Hampshire's 4th district, currently represented by Republican Ted Gatsas. In the State Senate, Bedford is part of New Hampshire's 9th State Senate district, currently represented by Republican Denise Ricciardi. Bedford is currently represented in the New Hampshire House of Representatives by Ted Gorski, Linda Gould, John Graham, Sue Mullen, Niki Kelsey, and Catherine Rombeau.

Bedford has long been a Republican stronghold in New Hampshire, voting for the GOP presidential nominee as far back as records are available. In 2020, the Republican winning streak in Bedford was finally broken as Democrat Joe Biden won the town with approximately 51.5% of the vote.

Bedford was one of only four towns in New Hampshire where Democrats backed Hillary Rodham Clinton when she sought the Democratic nomination for president in both 2008 and 2016.

Demographics

As of the census of 2020, there were 23,322 people residing in the town. The population density was 707 people per square mile. The racial makeup of the town was 86.1% White, 1.5% African American, 1.2% Native American, 7.2% Asian, 0.1% Pacific Islander, 0.4% from some other race, and 1.4% from two or more races. Hispanic or Latino of any race were 3.2% of the population.

As of the census of 2010, There were 7,364 households, out of which 40.9% had children under the age of 18 living with them, 69.8% were headed by married couples living together, 6.5% had a female householder with no husband present, and 20.8% were non-families. 16.5% of all households were made up of individuals, and 7.6% were someone living alone who was 65 years of age or older.  The average household size was 2.81 and the average family size was 3.19.

In the town, the age distribution of the population shows 28.6% under the age of 18, 4.7% from 18 to 24, 21.4% from 25 to 44, 31.7% from 45 to 64, and 13.5% who were 65 years of age or older.  The median age was 42.3 years. For every 100 females, there were 95.7 males.  For every 100 females aged 18 and over, there were 92.1 males.

For the period 2006–2010, the median income for a household in the town was $116,299 (in 2010 dollars), and the median income for a family was $127,589. Full-time male workers had median earnings of $99,366 versus $53,286 for females. The per capita income for the town was $50,952.  About 2.7% of families and 3.4% of the population were below the poverty line, including 4.2% of those under age 18 and 1.0% of those age 65 or over.  Bedford had the fifth highest average personal income in the state between 2006 and 2010.

Education

There are six schools in Bedford: Memorial Elementary School (National Blue Ribbon School awardee in 2012), Peter Woodbury Elementary School, and Riddle Brook Elementary (National Blue Ribbon School awardee in 2017) are neighborhood elementary schools that serve grades K through 4. McKelvie Intermediate School accommodates grades 5 and 6. Ross A. Lurgio Middle School and Bedford High School have served grades 7–8 and 9–12, respectively, since their establishment in 2007.

Ross A. Lurgio Middle School and Bedford High School comprise one  building. The unified construction aimed to take advantage of economies of scale by allowing the schools to share a kitchen, an auditorium, and security guards, but they operate as separate schools with different entrances, bus schedules, start times and end times. Additionally, key-controlled access is required to move between schools.

A small number of athletic fields on the campus of Saint Anselm College are located in Bedford.

Previously Bedford had an agreement with the Manchester School District so that students were sent to Manchester West High School. In 2005 about 900 high school aged residents of Bedford attended Manchester West. Beginning in fall 2007 Bedford stopped sending new students to Manchester West, so it could instead send them to Bedford High. By fall 2009 Bedford no longer sent any levels to Manchester West.

Notable people

 Silas Aiken (1799–1869), minister, author 
 David Atwood (1815–1889), newspaperman, U.S. congressman from Wisconsin; born in Bedford
 Chris Carpenter (born 1975), pitcher with the St. Louis Cardinals
 Zachariah Chandler (1813–1879), U.S. Secretary of the Interior 1875–1877, U.S. senator from Michigan; born in Bedford
 John Goffe (1701–1786), colonial soldier, other names, "Hunter John" 
 Carrie Jones (born 1982), bestselling author of young adult novels; born in Bedford
 Dean Kamen (born 1951), inventor of the Segway HT and the iBOT; owner of Manchester-based DEKA Corporation
 Grant Lavigne (born 1999), minor-league baseball player in the Colorado Rockies system
 Josh Meyers (born 1976), actor, comedian
 Seth Meyers (born 1973), comedian, talk-show host (Saturday Night Live, Late Night with Seth Meyers)
 Mace Moulton (1796–1867), U.S. congressman 1845–1847 (D, NH-AL)
 Rand Pecknold (born 1967), Quinnipiac men's ice hockey coach, 500-game winner in NCAA ice hockey
 Patricia Racette (born 1965), opera singer
 Laura Silverman (born 1966), actress, older sister of actress and comedian Sarah Silverman
 Sarah Silverman (born 1970), comedian, voice actress, writer
 Alex Steeves (born 1999), hockey player for the Toronto Maple Leafs
 John E. Sununu (born 1964), Republican U.S. senator (2003–2009); older brother of current New Hampshire governor Chris Sununu
 Peter Woodbury (1899–1970), judge of the United States Court of Appeals for the First Circuit

See also

1993 Little League World Series, when a team from Bedford advanced to the semi-finals

References

External links
 
 
 Bedford Historical Society
 New Hampshire Economic and Labor Market Information Bureau Profile

 
Towns in Hillsborough County, New Hampshire
Towns in New Hampshire
New Hampshire populated places on the Merrimack River